Rilwan Olanrewaju Hassan (born 9 February 1991) is a Nigerian professional footballer who plays as a midfielder for I-League club Sreenidi Deccan.

Career
Hassan played in the Europa League second round qualifying match against The New Saints on 14 July 2011, scoring the equalising goal. He spent ten seasons in the Danish Superliga with Midtjylland, winning two league championships, scoring 23 goals and making 30 assists in 222 appearances.

In May 2019, Hassan joined SønderjyskE signing a one-year contract with the option of a second year. In May 2022, after SønderjyskE's relegation from the Superliga, he left the club.

Hassan joined I-League club Sreenidi Deccan in January 2023.

Honours
SønderjyskE
Danish Cup: 2019–20

References

External links
 
 Official Danish Superliga stats

1991 births
Living people
Yoruba sportspeople
Sportspeople from Lagos
Nigerian footballers
Association football midfielders
Danish Superliga players
I-League players
FC Midtjylland players
SønderjyskE Fodbold players
Hamarkameratene players
Sreenidi Deccan FC players
Nigerian expatriate footballers
Nigerian expatriate sportspeople in Denmark
Expatriate men's footballers in Denmark
Nigerian expatriate sportspeople in India
Expatriate footballers in India